Penkino is a rural locality (a village) in Vilegodsky District, Arkhangelsk Oblast, Russia. The population was 3 as of 2010.

Geography 
Penkino is located 29 km northwest of Ilyinsko-Podomskoye (the district's administrative centre) by road. Kochnegovskaya is the nearest rural locality.

References 

Rural localities in Vilegodsky District